TITP may refer to:

T in the Park, a music festival in Scotland
TITP , a stock symbol used for the Greek company Titan Cement
This is Thin Privilege, a popular body privilege Tumblr blog.